Kateřina Čechová (born 21 March 1988 in Brno) is a Czech athlete who specialises in the 100 m and 200 m sprints.

Čechová won the 100 metres at the Czech Athletics Championships in 2008, 2009, 2010, 2011 and 2012. In 2012, she broke the championship record in recording a personal best time of 11.32 seconds and also won gold over 200 metres.

Achievements

References

External links 

 

1988 births
Living people
Sportspeople from Brno
Czech female sprinters
Olympic athletes of the Czech Republic
Athletes (track and field) at the 2012 Summer Olympics
Olympic female sprinters